Delta II was an expendable launch system, originally designed and built by McDonnell Douglas. Delta II was part of the Delta rocket family and entered service in 1989. Delta II vehicles included the Delta 6000, and the two later Delta 7000 variants ("Lite" and "Heavy"). The rocket flew its final mission ICESat-2 on 15 September 2018, earning the launch vehicle a streak of 100 successful missions in a row, with the last failure being GPS IIR-1 in 1997.
The Delta II series was developed after the 1986 Challenger accident and consisted of the Delta 6000-series and 7000-series, with two variants (Lite and Heavy) of the latter.

The Delta 6000-series introduced the Extra Extended Long Tank first stage, which was 12 feet longer, and the Castor 4A boosters. Six SRBs ignited at takeoff and three ignited in the air.

The Delta 7000-series introduced the RS-27A main engine, which was modified for efficiency at high altitude at some cost to low-altitude performance, and the lighter and more powerful GEM-40 solid boosters from Hercules. The Delta II Med-Lite was a 7000-series with no third stage and fewer strap-ons (often three, sometimes four) that was usually used for small NASA missions. The Delta II Heavy was a Delta II 792X with the enlarged GEM-46 boosters from Delta III.

Launch statistics

Launch Outcome 

Statistics are up-to-date .

Launches

References 

 
 
 
 

Lists of Delta launches
Lists of rocket launches